In mathematics, the replicator equation is a deterministic monotone non-linear and non-innovative game dynamic used in evolutionary game theory. The replicator equation differs from other equations used to model replication, such as the quasispecies equation, in that it allows the fitness function to incorporate the distribution of the population types rather than setting the fitness of a particular type constant. This important property allows the replicator equation to capture the essence of selection. Unlike the quasispecies equation, the replicator equation does not incorporate mutation and so is not able to innovate new types or pure strategies.

Equation 

Since the elements of the population vector  sum to unity by definition, the equation is defined on the n-dimensional simplex.

The replicator equation assumes a uniform population distribution; that is, it does not incorporate population structure into the fitness. The fitness landscape does incorporate the population distribution of types, in contrast to other similar equations, such as the quasispecies equation.

In application, populations are generally finite, making the discrete version more realistic. The analysis is more difficult and computationally intensive in the discrete formulation, so the continuous form is often used, although there are significant properties that are lost due to this smoothing. Note that the continuous form can be obtained from the discrete form by a limiting process.

To simplify analysis, fitness is often assumed to depend linearly upon the population distribution, which allows the replicator equation to be written in the form:

It can be shown that the change in the ratio of two proportions  with respect to time is:In other words, the change in the ratio is driven entirely by the difference in fitness between types.

Derivation of deterministic and stochastic replicator dynamics 
Define the proportion of each type to be . Assume that the change in each type is governed by geometric Brownian motion:where  is the fitness associated with type . The average fitness of the types . The Wiener processes are assumed to be uncorrelated. For , Itô's lemma then gives us:The partial derivatives are then:where  is the Kronecker delta function. These relationships imply that:Each of the components in this equation may be calculated as:Then the stochastic replicator dynamics equation for each type is given by:Assuming that the  terms are identically zero, the deterministic replicator dynamics equation is recovered.

Analysis 

The analysis differs in the continuous and discrete cases: in the former, methods from differential equations are utilized, whereas in the latter the methods tend to be stochastic. Since the replicator equation is non-linear, an exact solution is difficult to obtain (even in simple versions of the continuous form) so the equation is usually analyzed in terms of stability. The replicator equation (in its continuous and discrete forms) satisfies the folk theorem of evolutionary game theory which characterizes the stability of equilibria of the equation. The solution of the equation is often given by the set of evolutionarily stable states of the population.

In general nondegenerate cases, there can be at most one interior evolutionary stable state (ESS), though there can be many equilibria on the boundary of the simplex. All the faces of the simplex are forward-invariant which corresponds to the lack of innovation in the replicator equation: once a strategy becomes extinct there is no way to revive it.

Phase portrait solutions for the continuous linear-fitness replicator equation have been classified in the two and three dimensional cases. Classification is more difficult in higher dimensions because the number of distinct portraits increases rapidly.

Relationships to other equations 

The continuous replicator equation on  types is equivalent to the Generalized Lotka–Volterra equation in  dimensions. The transformation is made by the change of variables: 

where  is the Lotka–Volterra variable. The continuous replicator dynamic is also equivalent to the Price equation.

Discrete replicator equation 
When one considers an unstructured infinite population with non-overlapping generations, one should work with the discrete forms of the replicator equation. Mathematically, two simple phenomenological versions---

 

---are consistent with the Darwinian tenet of natural selection or any analogous evolutionary phenomena. Here, prime stands for the next time step. However, the discrete nature of the equations puts bounds on the payoff-matrix elements. Interestingly, for the simple case of two-player-two-strategy games, the type I replicator map is capable of showing period doubling bifurcation leading to chaos and it also gives a hint on how to generalize the concept of the evolutionary stable state to accommodate the periodic solutions of the map.

Generalizations 

A generalization of the replicator equation which incorporates mutation is given by the replicator-mutator equation, which takes the following form in the continuous version:

This equation is a simultaneous generalization of the replicator equation and the quasispecies equation, and is used in the mathematical analysis of language.

The discrete version of the replicator-mutator equation may have two simple types in line with the two replicator maps written above:

and

respectively.

The replicator equation or the replicator-mutator equation can be extended to include the effect of delay that either corresponds to the delayed information about the population state or in realizing the effect of interaction among players. The replicator equation can also easily be generalized to asymmetric games. A recent generalization that incorporates population structure is used in evolutionary graph theory.

References

Further reading 

 Cressman, R. (2003). Evolutionary Dynamics and Extensive Form Games The MIT Press.
 Taylor, P.D.; Jonker, L. (1978). "Evolutionary Stable Strategies and Game Dynamics". Mathematical Biosciences, 40: 145-156.
Sandholm, William H. (2010). Population Games and Evolutionary Dynamics. Economic Learning and Social Evolution, The MIT Press.

External links
 Izquierdo, S.S. & Izquierdo L.R. (2011). Online software: The Replicator-Mutator Dynamics with Three Strategies

Game theory
Differential equations
Evolutionary game theory
Evolutionary dynamics
Mathematical and theoretical biology
Mathematical economics